Spreading is the act of speaking extremely fast during a competitive debating event, with the intent that one's opponent will be penalized for failing to respond to all arguments raised. It is a portmanteau of "speed" and "reading". The tactic relies on the fact that "failing to answer all opposing arguments" is an easy criterion for judges to award a win on, and that speaking fast and fielding an overwhelming number of distinct arguments can be a viable strategy.

Spreading dominated the US school debate circuit in the 1990s. In the early 2000s, the style itself became a topic of many debates, with some arguing that it was exclusionary and possibly discriminatory, as it focused on speaking fast rather than being impassioned about a subject, and some educational companies began selling debate prep materials to assist those employing the style in packing as many topics as possible into their arguments, creating an advantage for those with more money.

The public forum debate format was introduced in the early 2000s, with the intent of slowing speakers down by rewarding deeper arguments, and in 2016 the "Big Questions" format explicitly required a "conversational speaking speed and tone". , spreading was described as still being "de rigueur" at Lincoln–Douglas debate format events.

Senator Ted Cruz, who was a national debating champion in his student days, described spreading as "a pernicious disease that has undermined the very essence of high school and college debate".

Advocates of spreading argue the technique of spreading allows for a greater variety and depth of arguments to be introduced into a debate without lengthening the time of a debate, which in policy debate are often longer than 2.5 hours.

See also

References

External links 
Video with examples of "spreading"

Debating